Itega is a settlement in Bushenyi District, in Uganda's Western Region.

Location

Itega is bordered by Rwenyena to the north, Kabuba to the east, Kibaniga to the south and Kasheshe to the west. Its geographical coordinates are:0°36'46.2"S, 30°15'35.7"E (Latitude:-0.612833; Longitude:30.259917).

Overview
Itega Village has been known for its resident's talent in music dance and drama, it won various mothers Union competitions and won matches among various communities in Kyeizooba.

There has been a long standing union between Itega and other communities like Itekashe solidarity.

Points of interest
The following points of interest are found in Itega or near its boundaries:
 Kabuba Church of Uganda
 Itega communal gathering (Ekitehurizi) 
 Kabuba Primary School
 Rwentuha Bugongi Road connects Bushenyi to Parts of Sheema District

Key people
 Muhirwe Julius (Kachuru) deceased 
 Jadress Kagamba Chairperson LC 1
 Tereza Kyamutwe deceased

See also
 Bushenyi
 Uganda

References

External links

Populated places in Western Region, Uganda
Cities in the Great Rift Valley
Bushenyi District